The 2022 UConn Huskies softball team represents the University of Connecticut in the 2022 NCAA Division I softball season. The Huskies are led by Laura Valentino in her 3rd year as head coach, and play as part of the Big East Conference after joining the conference for the 2020–21 academic year.  They play their home games at the newly rebuilt Connecticut Softball Stadium.

Previous season
UConn finished with a final record of 22–20, and finished third in the Big East with a conference record of 12–9.  They reached the final of the Big East Tournament, but fell to Villanova.

Personnel

Roster

Coaches

Schedule

References 

UConn
UConn Huskies softball seasons
UConn softball
Big East Conference softball champion seasons